Swedish–Novgorodian Wars were a series of conflicts in the 12th and 13th centuries between the Republic of Novgorod and medieval Sweden over control of the Gulf of Finland, an area vital to the Hanseatic League and part of the Varangian-Byzantine trade route. The Swedish attacks against Orthodox Russians had religious overtones, but before the 14th century there is no knowledge of official crusade bulls issued by the pope.

Background
Scandinavians maintained trade relations and other links with Novgorod from the Viking Age onwards. Merchants from Gotland operated both their own trading house (Gutagård) and the St. Olof church in Novgorod. Scandinavians also carried out isolated  raids on Novgorod. Eiríkr Hákonarson raided  Ladoga in 997, and his brother Sveinn Hákonarson followed suit in 1015. After the marriage of Yaroslav I (Grand Prince of Novgorod and Kiev) to Ingegerd of Sweden in 1019, Ladoga became a jarldom in the orbit of Kievan Rus. It was ruled by Ragnvald Ulfsson, the alleged father of King Stenkil of Sweden (reigned 1060-1066). Dynastic marriages took place between Russian and Scandinavian royal families - for example, in  the 1090s Stenkil's granddaughter  Christina married Mstislav of Novgorod, upon whose death in 1132 Novgorod seceded from Kievan Rus.

The major turning point into more permanent conflict between Sweden and Novgorod arrived with Sweden's firmer organization into the Catholic Church in the 12th century and papal involvement in crusades against lands controlled by the Orthodox Church.

Fighting resumes

The 12th century is poorly documented in Sweden, and Russian documents are fragmentary. From the surviving sources, however, it seems evident that the newly founded republic and Sweden drifted into hostilities that could not be permanently settled ever again.

According to the First Novgorod Chronicle, the Swedish troops attacked the Novgorod merchants somewhere in the Baltic Sea region and killed 150 Novgorodians in 1142. It is the first known case of hostilities between Sweden and Novgorod. In 1164, a strong Swedish fleet approached Ladoga but was soundly defeated with most of its ships captured by Novgorod.

According to Swedish sources, the Novgorodians and their Karelian allies launched pirate raids against mainland Sweden during the 12th century. During one of such raid, they brought to Novgorod the doors of the Sigtuna cathedral as loot. In the eyes of the northern crusaders, such actions justified war against Novgorod, although Novgorodian sources do not mention these events. Swedish sources refer to the attackers of Sigtuna as "heathens". Swedish sources also document that Jon jarl spent nine years fighting against Novgorodians and Ingrians at the end of the 12th century. These expeditions are not documented in Russian sources.

Battle of the Neva

After a long pause in open hostilities, Swedes purportedly undertook an attack against Novgorod in 1240. The only source of information on the attack is a Novgorodian chronicle. Soon after their fleet entered the mouth of the Neva River, the Swedes were roundly defeated in the Battle of the Neva by a young prince, Alexander of Novgorod, who would later be given the epithet "Nevsky" to memorialize this victory.

From then on, Sweden moved its interest to Finland. Its troops did not return to Neva before the end of the 13th century, when it had gained somekind of hold of Western Finland. Earlier, Swedes had also tried to establish a bridgehead in Estonia, in vain.

Focus moves to Finland

Apart from Ladoga, Novgorodian interests clashed with Sweden's in Finland, a region between Sweden and Russia which Russian forces sacked on numerous occasions from the 11th century onward. The raid in the winter of 1226-1227 led to heavy losses on the Finnish side. A Finnish retaliatory raid against Ladoga in 1228 ended in defeat, contributing to the Finns' subjugation by the Catholic Swedes during the Second Swedish Crusade in 1249. Seven years later, the Novgorodians devastated Swedish Finland again. 

In 1293 the Swedes won a part of western Karelia and built the fortress of Viborg (Russian: Vyborg) there. This expedition has traditionally been dubbed as the Third Swedish Crusade. Seven years later, they founded the fortress of Landskrona in the mouth of the Neva, on the river Okhta, and ruined the Novgorod settlements on the Neva. Later that year, the Novgorod troops retaliated by destroying Landskrona.

In the early 14th century, military tensions escalated and the two powers were continually at war.  In 1311, the Novgorodians devastated central Finland, where the Swedes had recently built a new castle. In response, a Swedish fleet embarked towards Ladoga and set that trade emporium on fire. Three years later, the Karelians' discontent with Novgorod's rule broke out into the open, as they killed Russian governors and sought help in Sweden. After several months of hostilities, Karelia submitted to Novgorod's authority again.
 
In 1318 Novgorod attacked Turku in southwestern Finland, burning the city and the cathedral as well as the episcopal castle in Kuusisto Castle. Four years later, they besieged Viborg and founded Oreshek, an important fortress dominating the entrance to Lake Ladoga.

Treaty of Nöteborg and its aftermath

The first treaty concluded by the parties to the conflict was the Treaty of Nöteborg (August 12, 1323), followed by the Treaty of Novgorod between Novgorod and Norway in 1326. The treaties were expected to bring "eternal peace" to the region, but turned out to provide only a temporary palliative.

As early as 1328, Sweden was encouraging settlers to take over the northern coast of the Gulf of Bothnia, which was defined by the treaty as Novgorod's possession. When Karelians rebelled against Novgorod in 1337, King Magnus Eriksson sent his troops in their support, managing to briefly occupy Korela Fortress. Next year, Novgorod besieged Viborg but an armistice was soon agreed upon.

After ten years of peace, the king felt ready to renew hostilities and demanded the Novgorodians to recognise the pope's authority. According to the Novgorodian First and Fourth chronicles, the king demanded that the Novgorodians debate with his "philosophers" (Catholic theologians) and whoever lost would convert to the religion of the winner.  Novgorodian archbishop Vasily Kalika conferred with the posadnik and other members of the city's elite and told the king that, since they had received Christianity from Constantinople, he should send his philosophers there to debate with the Byzantines.  Having received such a response, the king sent his army to Oreshek and set it ablaze. Novgorod soon recovered the lost ground.

The king attempted yet another fruitless attack in 1350. In the same year, the Black Death broke out in Northern Europe, effectively ending further hostilities.

Later developments
Later skirmishes were more sporadic. Sweden's attempts to control the Gulf of Bothnia resulted in Novgorod beginning construction of a castle near the Oulu River delta in the 1370s. Sweden replied by establishing their own castle nearby. Novgorod assaulted it in 1377, but was unable to take it. In the following year, Pope Gregory XI intervened and issued a crusade bull against Novgorod. Soon afterwards the Russians retreated from Ostrobothnia, leaving it for the Swedes.

In the late 14th century, the Novgorodians set up the fiefs of Korela, Oreshek, Koporye, Luga, and Ladoga as a sort of buffer state between their core dominions and Sweden. Several Lithuanian dukes renowned for their military skills were invited to rule this Ingrian duchy; Narimantas, his son Patrikas, and then Lengvenis. They helped fortify the Novgorodian-Swedish border and built several new forts in the region, including one in Yama.

Hostilities between the two powers were renewed in 1392 and 1411. However, Sweden had, by then, become a member state in the quarrelsome Union of Kalmar, and was preoccupied by the Scandinavian power struggle for the entire 15th century. The last conflict took place in 1445, several decades before Novgorod was absorbed into Muscovy. Novgorod's demise did not result in peace, however, and  conflict continued between the Grand Duchy of Moscow (later known as the Tsardom of Russia) and Sweden until the early 19th century.

See also 

 Capture of Novgorod (1611)
 Finnish–Novgorodian Wars

References

Further reading

 A.J.Hipping, Neva och Nyenskans, Helsingfors, 1837

12th-century conflicts
13th-century conflicts
Wars involving the Novgorod Republic
Wars involving Sweden
Novgorod Republic
Military history of Finland
12th century in Sweden
13th century in Sweden
Medieval Finland
Northern Crusades
Eastern Orthodox–Catholic conflicts